The 62nd Rifle Corps was a corps of the Soviet Red Army. It was part of the 22nd Army. It took part in the Great Patriotic War.

Organization 
 170th Rifle Division
 174th Rifle Division
 186th Rifle Division

Commanders

References 

Rifle corps of the Soviet Union